Lawrence Preston Joseph Graves (May 4, 1916 – January 15, 1994) served as the first bishop of the Diocese of Alexandria-Shreveport in Louisiana (1976-1982).  He previously served as an auxiliary bishop of the Diocese of Little Rock in Arkansas (1969-1973) and as bishop of the Diocese of Alexandria (1973 -1976)

Biography
Lawrence Graves was born on May 4, 1916, in Texarkana, Arkansas.  He attended the St. John Home Mission Seminary in Little Rock, Arkansas. He then studied at the Pontifical North American College in Rome, and at the Catholic University of America in Washington, D.C. Graves was ordained to the priesthood for the Diocese of Little Rock on June 11, 1942.

Auxiliary Bishop of Little Rock 
On February 24, 1969, Graves was appointed auxiliary bishop of the Diocese of Little Rock and Titular Bishop of Vina by Pope Paul VI. He received his episcopal consecration on April 25, 1969, from Bishop Albert Fletcher, with Bishops Lawrence De Falco and Warren L. Boudreaux serving as co-consecrators.

Bishop of Alexandria and Alexandria-Shreveport 
Following the retirement of Bishop Charles Greco, on May 10, 1973, Graves was named bishop of the Diocese of Alexandria by Paul VI . During his tenure, Graves established or improved continuing education for priests, offices for religious education and youth ministry, permanent diaconate program, and the communications apostolate in newspaper, radio, and television.

Paul VI changed the Diocese of Alexandria to the Diocese of Alexandria-Shreveport in 1976, with Greco remaining as bishop.

After nine years at Louisiana, Graves resigned as bishop on July 20, 1982. He died eleven years thereafter at the age of seventy-seven.

References

Episcopal succession

1916 births
1994 deaths
Roman Catholic bishops of Alexandria
People from Alexandria, Louisiana
People from Texarkana, Arkansas
Roman Catholic Diocese of Little Rock
Catholic University of America alumni
20th-century Roman Catholic bishops in the United States
Roman Catholic bishops in Arkansas